Aquila is a British children's television show which aired on the BBC from 1997 to 1998. An episode was aired once a week, and was based on the story of two boys, Tom Baxter and Geoff Reynolds, who find a spacecraft when digging in a field. The first series was based on the 1997 book Aquila by British author Andrew Norriss who novelised the second series though this was not published until 2010.

Synopsis
The two boys are on a weekend away with their mothers where they do some digging for treasure at a local moor. As Geoff is digging, he falls into a cavern followed cautiously by Tom. It is there they find the skeleton of a Roman Centurion, standing beside a large red object which looks like a giant boulder. One of the boys notices a hollowed out area in this 'boulder' which turns out to be a two-seat cockpit. The craft, which is called 'Aquila', soon turns out to be something more advanced than Roman technology, and by pressing the numerous coloured buttons in the cockpit the boys learn more about this strange craft and take off upwards into the sky.

The story becomes more tense and yet humorous as the boys try to think of ways to hide their amazing discovery, prevent doing damage with it, and communicating with it. Eventually, the boys manage to find a way of communicating with Aquila in English after initially only being able to in Latin, but even then the show managed to end each week with a dramatic cliff-hanger as a new problem arose.

The last ever line in the series came as the characters discover the source of Aquila, and the camera pans into outer space to see a massive abandoned spaceship orbiting the sun. They realise the significance of this and exclaim 'A battle cruiser! You could have some serious fun with a battle cruiser!'.

The proposed third series would have seen a broader, more overtly humorous tone, to appease Children's BBC's changing demographic and focus on a slightly younger 6–11 age group. However, as part of Children's BBC's shake-up and rebranding in 1997, the third series was never made.

Episode list

Series 1 (1997)

Series 2 (1998)

'Aquila'
'Aquila' is a liferaft from a larger ship, built by the Yrrillians from the planet Deneb. The ship can fly an almost infinite distance, and can fly in space without the need for crew spacesuits, but, due to damage sustained to the 'Oxygen Regeneration' system before Aquila was unearthed, the air inside the ship would only last for 6 hours which was featured in one of the episodes of the television series. Some other abilities of the ship include invisibility, a form of verbal remote control, lasers, a holographic interface and the Core Defence Wave Gun (capable of passing out everything in a 300 coleymort (a Yrrillian measurement, which the boys initially mistake for centimetres, equivalent to 0.637 meters) radius).

Aquila can be programmed to execute basic manoeuvres from the detection of certain signals. This feature was used when the boys program it to travel to the location of an inaudible dog whistle. The problem arose when a dog owner blew his own whistle when the craft was in invisible mode in the grounds of a stately home. This rendered the craft missing but luckily a friend of the boys, Dunstan, found it and brought it to them. He also discovers that Aquila can be connected to a computer and be contacted by email. In the case of the 2010 novelization Aquila can also be contacted using mobile phones, as Dunstan discovers, which the boys find more convenient than using the dog whistle and it can use the phones for verbal communication since its vocal generator was destroyed millennia ago though the software remained unharmed.

Aquila has the ability to demolish objects by flying directly through them. This ability was used by the boys when they flew it through a brick wall while discovering some of Aquila's capabilities. After inspection by the boys, the craft was found completely unharmed.
Aquila stores everything it sees on egg shaped objects which can be played back on the holographic screen. It records approximately 1600 years of data. If the eggs are not replaced, then the ship starts recording over the start of the 'footage' – this occurs in an episode of the television series. Aquila is also equipped with a lie detector that can interpret conversations in its black box footage as well as immediately outside it.

'Aquila' is the Latin translation of the word eagle (see Aquila). The words inscribed on the Centurion's safety harness (formerly inside the ship),  'Licat volare si super tergum aquila volat', translates as 'A man can fly where he will, if he rides on the back of an eagle.' This proverb was derived from an ancient Greek story, where one day, the gods decided to elect the noblest bird of all by having them race to the top of Mount Olympus. The eagle appeared to be winning, but the tiny sparrow had been resting on the eagle's back for the entire race, and at the last moment leaped up and won the race.

The name of the craft is inscribed on its own exterior as 'AQVILA', since 'u' and 'v' were different letter-forms of the same grapheme in Latin: 'u' in minuscule (lower case) (not used in the early centuries A.D for inscriptions) and 'V' in majuscule (capital).

External links

 
 Andrew Norriss' Homepage
 Information about Andrew Norriss's work
 

British television shows based on children's books
1990s British children's television series
1997 British television series debuts
1998 British television series endings
BBC children's television shows
1990s British science fiction television series
British children's science fiction television series